Ole Ålgård (9 September 1921 – 26 January 1995) was a Norwegian diplomat.

Early life
He was born in Gjesdal as a son of farmer and petty officer Gabriel Aalgaard (1881–1973) and Berta Serine Egeland (1895–1983). He finished his secondary education at Stavanger Cathedral School in and graduated with the cand.jur. degree from the University of Oslo in 1946. He chaired Sosialistisk studentlag in 1946, and was hired as a secretary in the Ministry of Foreign Affairs in the same year. He worked two years in Moscow before returning to Norway in 1950. In November 1947 he married Rigmor Braathe.

Later career
From 1951 to 1956 he was a legation secretary in Vienna, changing to chargé d'affaires as Norway got an embassy in the country. He mainly worked in Norway from 1956 to 1961, as an embassy counsellor at the Norwegian United Nations embassy from 1961 to 1964, and as embassy counsellor in the Council of Europe from 1965 to 1967.

He was Norway's ambassador to the People's Republic of China from 1967 to 1971 and to the United Nations from 1971 to 1982. He was the President of the United Nations Security Council in April 1979 and June 1980. He was the ambassador to Denmark from 1982 to 1989. He chaired the Norwegian Atlantic Committee. He settled at his wife's family farm in Våler, Østfold in 1989, where he died in January 1995.

He was decorated as a Commander of the Order of St. Olav in 1978, and held the Grand Cross of the Order of the Dannebrog. He was a Knight of the Belgian Order of Leopold and the Order of the Lion of Finland, and held the Austrian Order of Merit.

References

1921 births
1995 deaths
People from Gjesdal
University of Oslo alumni
Norwegian civil servants
Permanent Representatives of Norway to the United Nations
Ambassadors of Norway to China
Ambassadors of Norway to Denmark
Norwegian expatriates in the Soviet Union
Norwegian expatriates in Austria
Norwegian expatriates in the United States
Norwegian expatriates in Belgium
Grand Crosses of the Order of the Dannebrog
Knights of the Order of the Lion of Finland